Kenny Evans (born April 6, 1979) is a retired American high jumper. He finished thirteenth at the 2000 Olympic Games. His personal best jump is 2.30 metres, achieved in April 2000 in Fayetteville.

Evans won the high jump at the 1998 and 2001 NCAA Indoor Track and Field Championships. He was also a three-time champion indoors and a winner outdoors at the Southeastern Conference Championships.

Evans is the father of college basketball player Keenan Evans of Texas Tech University.

References

External links

1979 births
Living people
American male high jumpers
Arkansas Razorbacks men's track and field athletes
Athletes (track and field) at the 2000 Summer Olympics
Olympic track and field athletes of the United States